Episcomitra is a genus of sea snails, marine gastropod mollusks in the family Mitridae.

Species
Species within the genus Episcomitra include:
 Episcomitra cornicula (Linnaeus, 1758)
 Episcomitra zonata (Marryat, 1818)

References

 Monterosato T.A. (1917). Molluschi viventi e quaternari raccolti lungo le coste della Tripolitania dall'ing. Camillo Crema. Bollettino della Società Zoologica Italiana. ser. 3, 4: 1-28, pl. 1

External links
 Fedosov A., Puillandre N., Herrmann M., Kantor Yu., Oliverio M., Dgebuadze P., Modica M.V. & Bouchet P. (2018). The collapse of Mitra: molecular systematics and morphology of the Mitridae (Gastropoda: Neogastropoda). Zoological Journal of the Linnean Society. 183(2): 253-337

 
Gastropod genera